Fame: The Musical is a singing and dance contest in Ireland, produced by Screentime ShinAwiL for RTÉ. The audition and Fame Bootcamp stages were filmed around Ireland and in London.

The shows aim was to find actors for the parts of "Nick" and "Serena" for the highly successful stage production of Fame.
On 13 June 2010 it was announced that Ben Morris would play the part of Nick and Jessica Cervi would play the part of Serena in the Irish tour of Fame.

Personnel 
Judges

Host
Derek Mooney

The Show

Results Summary
Colour key:

Episode 1
Judges Robert C Kelly, Simon Delaney and Jacinta Whyte travel around Ireland looking for the next "Nick" and "Serena". 53 were chosen to go on to the Fame Bootcamp.

Episode 2
A group of young singers, actors and dancers attend The Fame Bootcamp. The three judges choose 12 to go forward for the live shows. Stuart Pollock, Ben Morris, Michael Joseph, Conleth Kane, Drew Millar and Séan Carey will battle it out for the role of "Nick", while Jessica Cervi, Philomena Fitzpatrick, Sarah O'Connor, Caoimhe Garvey, Hollie O'Donoghue and Susan Hall will audition for the role of "Serena". Susan Hall turn down the opportunity to audition for the role at the last minute leaving the 6th and final contestant to be revealed on the night of the first Live show.

Live Show 1
Erica Gimpel replaced Jacinta Whyte and joined Simon and Robert for the live shows as a judge at the Helix. As Susan Hall dropped out in episode 2 the judges choose Róisín Magee to replace her. 
Theme: Songs from musicals
Group performances: Fame and Starmaker (lead by Drew)

Judges' vote to save
Gimpel: Sarah O'Connor - thought that Sarah had performed better
Delaney: Drew Millar - avoided being parochial
Kelly: Sarah O'Connor - thought it would be unfair to keep Drew in a competition that he couldn't win.

Live Show 2
Michael Joseph, Conleth Kane, Séan Carey, Philomena Fitzpatrick, Caoimhe Garvey and Hollie O'Donoghue all take to the stage for the first time.
Theme: Songs from musicals
Group performances: Fame and Starmaker (lead by Philomena )

Judges' vote to save
Kelly: Conleth Kane - based it on the whole rehearsals and live shows but ultimately on the final duet
Gimpel: Conleth Kane -  already stated she had had issues with Philomena's pitching
Delaney; Conleth Kane - based it on the final duet

Live Show 3

Group performances:Circle of Life (The Lion King) and Starmaker (lead by Stuart.)

As the results were called out by Derek Mooney mistakenly saved Stuart only to have stop the show the let the audience know that he had made a mistake and that Conleth had been saved by the public vote.
Judges' vote to save
Kelly: Stuart Pollock - gave no reason
Gimpel: Sarah O'Conner - gave no reason
Delaney: Sarah O'Conner - gave no reason

Live Show 4
Group performances: One Voice (Barry Manilow) and Starmaker (lead by Hollie).

Judges' vote to save
Gimpel: Ben Morris - stated that Ben "put his heart on the stage"
Delaney: Ben Morris - stated that it was a difficult choice
Kelly: was not required to vote as the judges reached a majority verdict but commended both contestants.

Live Show 5
Group performance: "A Star Is Born" and "Starmaker" (lead by Caoimhe)

Judges' vote to save
Delaney : Conleth Kane - gave no reason
Kelly : Conleth Kane - gave no reason
Gimpel: was not required to vote as the verdict was already declared but said that Caoimhe could hold her head high for getting this far

Live Show 6
Theme: Judges Choice
Group performance: Starmaker (lead by Conleth)
Vocal coach: Jancinta Whyte.

Judges' vote to save
Gimpel: Sarah O'Connor - said Conleth grew right throughout the series
Kelly: Conleth Kane - said he had always praised both Conleth and Sarah
Delaney: Sarah O'Connor - stated it was "an impossible choice" and there was nothing between them

Semi-final
Theme: Contestants Choice
Group performance: One Night Only and  Starmaker (lead by Michael & Roísín)
Vocal Coach: Erica Gimpel

Two acts were eliminated from the semi-final (one boy & one girl) and for the first time in the series, there was no final duet. The three remaining girls were brought out first and Róisín Magee was voted out by public vote. Then the three remaining boys were brought out and Michael Joseph was voted out by the public. After the announcements, Róisín and Michael bid farewell by leading a group performance of "Starmaker".

Final
Jacinta Whyte returned and joined Robert, Erica and Simon for the final show.
Themes: Westend Duet; Contestants favorite performance
Group performances;
Group 1 (Eliminated Contestants) - "Don't Stop Believin'"
 Group 2 (Finalists) - "The Time of My Life"
Duet performances:
Noel Sullivan with Sarah O'Conner/Jessica Cervi
Susan McFadden with Séan Carey/Ben Morris

All the finalists returned to the stage and Derek Mooney announced Ben & Jessica as the winners of the parts of Nick & Serena respectively. Ben & Jessica then closed the series with a performance of Let's Play A Love Scene.

Reception
The Evening Herald gave the show 3 out of 5 stars stating "The show has been criticised for putting the vote to the public, hence turning what should be a talent contest into a popularity contest. However, there's no doubt that the biggest voices in the competition made it to the final last night. Yes, it was cheesy and over-sentimental, but Fame: The Musical was the type of show that many tuned into in spite of themselves".

Audience figures were below that of previous RTÉ reality talent shows, however the final was watched by over 500,000 viewers.

Finalists

Twelve contestants made it through the audition rounds and performed during the live shows.

The Boys

* at the start of the series

The Girls

* at the start of the series

See also
 You're a Star
 The All Ireland Talent Show
 Popstars

References

2010 Irish television series debuts
Irish talent shows
Singing talent shows
Fame (franchise)